Hypenidium roborowskii is a species of tephritid or fruit flies in the genus Acidogona of the family Tephritidae.

Distribution
Caucasus, Central Asia, Afghanistan, China.

References

Tephritinae
Insects described in 1908
Diptera of Asia
Taxa named by Theodor Becker